My back pages is the debut studio album by Japanese pop band The Tambourines. It was released on September 28, 2002, through Giza Studio.

Background
The album consists of four previous released singles, such as "Easy game", "Hijack brandnew days", "Mayonaka ni Kizuita Funny Love" and "Stay Young".

Three songs out of ten were composed by band themselves.

The single Easy Game was released in the Giza Studio's compilation album Giza Studio Masterpiece Blend 2001 and Stay young in the compilation album Giza Studio Masterpiece Blend 2002.

Chart performance
The album peaked at No. 86 on the Oricon charts in its first week. It charted for 1 week and sold 2,750 copies. It was their only album which entered into Top 100 Oricon rankings.

Track listing

In media
My back pages - theme song for YTV program Asa Ichi!
Stay young - ending theme for Tokyo Broadcasting System Television program Oujisama no Branch

References

2002 debut albums
Being Inc. albums
Japanese-language albums
Giza Studio albums